The Financial News is a South Korean daily newspaper. The newspaper's motto is "First-Class financial paper". Kwon Seong Cheol, an alumnus of Seoul National University, was appointed president of the paper in 2010. A new president was appointed in March 2021.

References

External links
The Financial News 

Korean-language newspapers
Newspapers published in South Korea